Joaquín Paris y Ricaurte (Bogotá, Colombia, August 15, 1795 – Honda, Colombia, October 2, 1868) was a hero of the Latin American war for independence. 

Paris was born in the former city of Santa Fe in Colombia to an aristocratic family of Spanish descent. His father was born in Madrid and came to Santa Fe as Secretary of Virey Messía de la Cerda. Prior to the independence war, he joined the patriotic ranks, ten days after declaration of independence. 

Governor of Neiva and Cundinamarca States. Secretary of War, vicepresident of Colombia in 1955, 87 years after his death.

París died in Honda in 1868.

1795 births
1868 deaths
People from Bogotá
Presidential Designates of Colombia
Colombian people of Spanish descent